The 1992 Trans America Athletic Conference baseball tournament was held at Southeastern Louisiana Diamond on the campus of Southeastern Louisiana University in Hammond, Louisiana. This was the fourteenth tournament championship held by the Trans America Athletic Conference, in its fourteenth year of existence.  won their first tournament championship in their first year in the league and earned the conference's automatic bid to the 1992 NCAA Division I baseball tournament.

Format and seeding 
The top two finishers from each division by conference winning percentage qualified for the tournament, with the top seed from one division playing the second seed from the opposite in the first round. Georgia State was ineligible and did not play games that counted in the conference standings, having restarted their program for the 1992 season. Both top seeds were claimed by tiebreaker.

Bracket

All-Tournament Team 
The following players were named to the All-Tournament Team.

Most Valuable Player 
Kirk Bullinger was named Tournament Most Valuable Player. Bullinger was a pitcher for Southeastern Louisiana.

References 

Tournament
ASUN Conference Baseball Tournament
Trans America Athletic Conference baseball tournament